The Milne Ice Shelf, a fragment of the former Ellesmere Ice Shelf, is located in the Qikiqtaaluk Region, Nunavut, Canada. It is the second largest ice shelf in the Arctic Ocean.

It had been the last ice shelf in the Canadian Arctic to be fully intact until July 2020, when over 40 percent of the sheet collapsed within two days, a consequence of global warming. An uninhabited research camp was lost when the shelf collapsed. It included instruments for measuring water flow through the ice shelf.

References

Ice shelves of Qikiqtaaluk Region